The 2016 Washington State Cougars football team represented Washington State University during the 2016 NCAA Division I FBS football season. The team was coached by fifth-year head coach Mike Leach and played their home games at Martin Stadium in Pullman, Washington. They were members of the North Division of the Pac-12 Conference. They finished the season 8–5, 7–2 in Pac-12 play to finish in second place in the North Division. They were invited to the Holiday Bowl where they were defeated by Minnesota.

Previous season

Schedule

Rankings

Game summaries

Eastern Washington

at Boise State

Idaho

Oregon

at Stanford

UCLA

at Arizona State

at Oregon State

Arizona

California

at Colorado

Washington

Minnesota–Holiday Bowl

Coaching staff

Source:

References

Washington State
Washington State Cougars football seasons
Washington State Cougars football